Dagný Brynjarsdóttir (born 10 August 1991) is an Icelandic professional footballer who plays for West Ham United in the FA Women's Super League and the Iceland national team. She previously played for Bayern Munich, Portland Thorns, Selfoss, and collegiate soccer for the Florida State Seminoles.

Early life
Dagný started playing football when she was six years old, with her first club, KFR from Hella and Hvolsvöllur. She played for them in 2006 as they competed in a joint effort with Ægir from Þorlákshöfn. Since 2007 she has played for Valur from Reykjavík in the best women's league in Iceland, Úrvalsdeild.

In 2011 Dagný began attending Florida State University and began playing for Florida State Seminoles. She returned to Iceland to play for Valur during the summer months.

College career

Florida State Seminoles 
Dagný attended Florida State University where she was a four-year starter from 2011–2014 for the Seminoles in the midfielder position. She helped lead the Seminoles to a national championship in 2014. Dagný holds the school record for 19 game-winning goals and is second in total goals (44), shots (232), and points (111). She was a first team All-American in 2014 and the runner-up for the MAC Hermann Trophy, given annually to the best college female soccer player. She was named Soccer America 2014 Women's Player of the Year. She was also named as a first team Scholar All-American by the National Soccer Coaches Association of America.

Club career

Selfoss and Bayern München
In 2014, Dagný played for Selfoss. In 2015, she signed for the second half of the season to the German Frauen-Bundesliga team Bayern München.

Portland Thorns
After her career at Florida State, Dagný did not sign up for the 2015 draft to play in the National Women's Soccer League in the United States. In May 2015, she attempted to play during the 2015 season with the Western New York Flash, but was prevented from doing so by league rules.

In October 2015, the Portland Thorns FC announced that they had acquired rights for her from the Boston Breakers and that she would play for the Thorns in the 2016 NWSL season.

After spending the 2016 and 2017 seasons with the Thorns, it was announced that Dagný would miss the 2018 season due to pregnancy. She gave birth to a son in June 2018 and returned to training with the team in March 2019.

Selfoss
In 2019, Dagný left the Thorns, citing the difficulty of raising her son so far away from her home nation and family, and returned to Iceland to sign with Selfoss.

West Ham United
On 28 January 2021, Dagný signed for FA WSL side West Ham United. She made her debut for the club in a 2-0 home defeat in a league match against Chelsea on 7 March 2021 She ended her first season campaign with 9 appearances across all competition with no goals. 

It was not until the 2021-22 season that she scored her first goal for the club in the season opener against Manchester City in a 2-0 league win on 3 October 2021. She then scored West Ham United's extra-time winner at Reading in the FA Women's Cup fifth round on 27 February 2022. She ended the season with 27 appearances for West Ham United in all competitions, scoring six goals.

Prior to the start of the 2022-23 season, Dagný switched her kit number from 32 to 10, following the departure of Kateřina Svitková from the club in the summer. She was then named club captain for the club by manager Paul Konchesky.

International career
Dagný made her debut for the senior Iceland national football team at the 2010 Algarve Cup; in a 2–0 defeat to the United States on 24 February 2010. She was called up to be part of the national team for the UEFA Women's Euro 2013. In Iceland's final group match against the Netherlands, Dagný headed the only goal of the game to secure her team's place in the quarter-finals. It later emerged that she had played the game with a broken foot, sustained in the previous match against Germany. On 7 April 2022, she played her 100th match for Iceland in a 5–0 win over Belarus in the 2023 FIFA Women's World Cup qualification.

Personal life

Dagný gave birth to son Brynjar in June 2018, making her one of several mothers playing in NWSL. She subsequently married the father, Omar Pall, in July 2019.

Career statistics

Club

International 

Scores and results list Iceland's goal tally first, score column indicates score after each Brynjarsdóttir goal.

Honours

Florida State Seminoles

 ACC: 2011, 2013, 2014
 ACC Regular Season: 2012, 2014
 NCAA: 2014

Valur

 Besta deild kvenna: 2007, 2008, 2009, 2010
 Icelandic Women's Football Cup: 2009, 2010, 2011
 Icelandic Women's Football Cup runner-up: 2012
 Icelandic Women's Football League Cup: 2007, 2010
 Icelandic Women's Football League Cup runner-up: 2008, 2011, 2012, 2013
 Icelandic Women's Super Cup: 2007, 2008, 2009, 2010, 2011
 Icelandic Women's Super Cup runner-up: 2012

Selfoss

 Icelandic Women's Super Cup: 2020

FC Bayern Munich

 Frauen-Bundesliga: 2015

Portland Thorns

 NWSL Regular Season: 2016
 NWSL: 2017

Individual
 Herman Trophy Finalist: 2014

See also 
 List of foreign NWSL players
 List of Florida State University people

References

External links

 
 
 Portland Thorns player profile
 
 Profile at fussballtransfers.com 
 

1991 births
Living people
Dagny Brynjarsdottir
Dagny Brynjarsdottir
Florida State Seminoles women's soccer players
Dagny Brynjarsdottir
Expatriate women's footballers in Germany
Expatriate women's soccer players in the United States
Portland Thorns FC players
National Women's Soccer League players
Women's association football midfielders
FC Bayern Munich (women) players
West Ham United F.C. Women players
Dagny Brynjarsdottir
Dagny Brynjarsdottir
Frauen-Bundesliga players
Dagny Brynjarsdottir
Dagny Brynjarsdottir
Icelandic expatriate sportspeople in England
Women's Super League players
FIFA Century Club
UEFA Women's Euro 2022 players
UEFA Women's Euro 2017 players